Alexeyevo is a rural locality (a village) in Yershovskoye Rural Settlement, Sheksninsky District, Vologda Oblast, Russia. The population was 10 as of 2002.

Geography 
Alexeyevo is located 26 km north of Sheksna (the district's administrative centre) by road. Gorka is the nearest rural locality.

References 

Rural localities in Sheksninsky District